Ray Charles (1930–2004) was an American singer-songwriter, musician and composer.

Ray Charles may also refer to:
Ray Charles (album), 1957
Ray Charles (musician, born 1918) (1918–2015), American musician and leader of The Ray Charles Singers
"Ray Charles" (song), 2011 single from American rap group Chiddy Bang
"Ray Charles", a song from La Fouine album Drôle de parcours

See also
Charles Ray (disambiguation)